The Istituto Lombardo Accademia di Scienze e Lettere is an Italian academy founded by Napoleon in 1797. At the time of the foundation the Istituto was an institution of the Cisalpine Republic and its name was Istituto Nazionale della Repubblica Cisalpina.

The first location of the Istituto was Bologna and the academy was bound to include no more than 60 members. The first 31 were appointed by Napoleon in 1802 and the first president was Alessandro Volta, who started serving in 1803. The Istituto was concerned with Natural Sciences, Political Sciences and Arts.

Upon requests of its members, in 1810 Napoleon changed the name of the Istituto in Istituto Reale di Scienze, Lettere ed Arti. Its new location was Palazzo Brera in Milan, where it is still located nowadays. Additional sections were then added in Bologna, Verona, Padua and Venice.

At Napoleon's fall the Istituto passed under the administration of the Austrian government and then, since 1859 until today, under the administration of the Italian government.

See also
International Giovanni Sacchi Landriani Prize

References

External links
Official website, with brief history (in Italian).
Official rules of the Istituto (in Italian).

Scientific organisations based in Italy
History of Milan
Italy
Organisations based in Rome
Learned societies of Italy
1797 establishments in Italy
Organizations established in 1797